The discography of Grinderman, a former London-based alternative rock group, consists of two studio albums, one remix album, eight singles, and six music videos.

Grinderman was formed by vocalist and guitarist Nick Cave, multi-instrumentalist Warren Ellis, bassist Martyn P. Casey and drummer Jim Sclavunos, as a side project to Nick Cave and the Bad Seeds, in 2006. The band released its debut eponymous album, Grinderman, in 2007 on Mute Records. The album charted in ten countries upon its release and reached number 1 on the US Billboard Heatseekers Albums. Following a short break to focus on Nick Cave and the Bad Seeds fourteenth studio album, Dig, Lazarus, Dig!!! (2008), the band released its second studio album, Grinderman 2 in 2010. A major critical success, the album resulted in five singles and extensive touring over a two-year-period. Grinderman disbanded in December 2011 following a performance at the Meredith Music Festival in Victoria, Australia to focus on The Bad Seeds upcoming material. However, Jim Sclavunos has since said: "I can't predict what the future of Grinderman is – if there is a future."

Grinderman and Grinderman 2 were moderate commercial successes, charting in a number of countries within the first week of their releases. Grinderman has been certified Gold in Greece, with sales of over 6,000 copies. Collectively, the band's two studio albums have sold 88,000 copies in the United States, according to Nielsen SoundScan.

Albums

Studio albums

Remix albums

Singles

Retail singles

Promotional singles

Other appearances

Studio

Guest

Music videos

Notes
I  Sales figure resprent sales of both Grinderman and Grinderman 2, as of December 2011.
II  Limited edition release only, released on Record Store Day 2011.
III  Promotional CDR also featuring "Depth Charge Ethel" and "Electric Alice."
IV  Promotional CDR featuring remixes by G.e.R.M., Midfield General, Adam Freeland, T.Raumschmiere and Electronic Periodic.

References
General references

Specific references

External links
Grinderman official site
Grinderman at Mute Records

Discographies of Australian artists
Rock music group discographies